Arnaud Vallens is a French actor from Brive-la-Gaillarde.

In early 2012 Vallens crossed paths with Lisa Escudero, the granddaughter of singer Leny Escudero. She offered him an opportunity to play George Dandin by Molière at the Avignon Off Festival the same year. On his return from Avignon, Vallens reprised the role of George Dandin in Paris. Vallens was subsequently offered various other acting work, including parts in music videos and TV series. He was also offered roles in short films such as The Pipers Ammar Quteineh, awarded at EICAR 2013; and The Voice of Thief by Adnan Jodorowsky, which won at the Strange Festival in 2013 and the Festival of Gerardmer in 2014. At the same time, he wrote, produced and directed his own works such as Encumbrance, a short film on the subject of disability, and For Iksha, a long-form feature film.

Filmography

Movies

Longs Movies 
 2013 : Joséphine de Agnès Obadia : Businessman
 2013 : Les Gamins d'Anthony Marciano: Délégué
 2012 : Maman de Alexandra Leclère
 2000 : Aïe] : Visiteur hôpital
 2000 : La Confusion des genres d'Ilan Duran Cohen : Le bellâtre

Shorts Movies 
 2015 : The Shower  de Arnaud Vallens 
 2015 : Encumbrance  de Arnaud Vallens 
 2013 : Angel and Death  de Fabien Dovetto et Aurélien Milhaud
 2013 : L'Ascenseur de William Van De Walle
 2013 : Fric-Frac au 2310  de Fabien Dovetto et Aurélien Milhaud
 2013 : L'amour a la clé de Johan Libéreau avec Noémie Merlant
 2012 : The Voice Thief de Adan Jodorowsky
 2012 : Nous étions quelques hommes de Maxime Lebas : Homme de main 
 1999 : Errare humanum est de Olivier Cortet

Medium Movies
 2014 : The Pipers d'Ammar Quteineh : Captain Mark 
 2013 : Fulfilled Promise de Ammar Quteineh : Mercenaire
 2013 : Projection de Léo Devienne

Television

Téléfilms 
 2013 :  de Julien Israël épisode n°80 de la série télévisée "Au nom de la vérité" produit par Arthur : Father
 2000 : La Bicyclette bleue de Thierry Binisti : Soldat français

Series 
 2014 : Groland 
 2000 : PJ de Gérard Vergez : client de marché
 2000 : H, Canal+ : Patient
 1999 : Justice de Gilbert Le Guen : Gardien de la paix

Others

Clips 
 2014 : Barry de Raphaël Zanetto
 1999 : Only Rely on Myself by Olivier Cortet

Ads 
 2015 : Film Axance-Forbiiz  by Julien Joyeux-Vittoriani 
 2013 : Jean Bon de Morgann Gicquel
 2012 : Le Souffle de Wilfrid Brimo for Fédération Nationale de Solidarité des Femmes

Théâtre 

 2014 : Dandin (Molière) Mise en Scène de Lisa Escudero: George Dandin Théâtre Abc Théâtre, Paris 
 2013 : Dandin (Molière) Mise en Scène de Lisa Escudero: George Dandin Théâtre Darius Milhaud, Paris 
 2012 : Dandin (Molière) Mise en Scène de Lisa Escudero: George Dandin Avignon 
 1998 : Desire Under the Elms de  Eugene O’Neill - Mise en Scène Peter Douglas Cabot, Londres
 1996 : Le Médecin Volant (Molière) Mise en Scène de Arnaud Vallens : Valère, Caen

References

External links 
 
  Arnaud Vallens on Allociné
  Site officiel de Arnaud Vallens

French male actors
21st-century French male actors
1973 births
Living people
People from Brive-la-Gaillarde